Vladimír Slavínský (26 September 1890  16 August 1949) was a Czech film director, screenwriter and actor.

Life
Vladimír Slavínský was born Otakar Vladimír Pitrman in Dolní Štěpánice, on September 26, 1890. Since his youth he acted in amateur theatres while working as a typesetter. In 1912 he wrote his first two screenplays. After the World War I he co-founded a production company Pojafilm with Alois Jalovec and started directing. He directed mostly sentimental dramas and comedy films, which were very commercially successful at the time.
He died in Prague on August 16, 1949.

Selected filmography

Director
 The Son of the Mountains (1925)
 The Little Window (1933)
 Three Men in the Snow (1936)
 Delightful Story (1936)
 The Minister's Girlfriend (1940)
 Lawyer of the Poor (1941)
 Chalk and Cheese (1941)
 Fish Out of Water (1942)
 Seine beste Rolle (1944), Nazi German film
 The last Mohican (1947)
 No Surgery Hours Today (1948)

References

External links
 

1890 births
1949 deaths
Czech film directors
Czechoslovak film directors
Silent film directors
Czech screenwriters
Silent film screenwriters
Male screenwriters
20th-century Czech male actors
People from the Kingdom of Bohemia
20th-century screenwriters